Victoria Bergsman (born 4 May 1977) is a Swedish songwriter, musician, and vocalist best known as singer of the indie pop band The Concretes from 1995 to 2006. Since announcing her departure from the band on 24 July 2006 she has been recording for her new solo project Taken by Trees. Bergsman also provided guest vocals for the hit Peter Bjorn and John single "Young Folks" from the album Writer's Block.

In 2009, her solo project Taken by Trees released East of Eden, a collaboration with Pakistani musicians. A version of the album will be released with a short documentary about its recording.

Other works
In 2005 Bergsman acted in a music video for the pop song "Temptation", released by the English band New Order.

References

Living people
1977 births
Swedish indie rock musicians
Place of birth missing (living people)
21st-century Swedish singers
21st-century Swedish women singers
English-language singers from Sweden